Wilkostów  is a village in the administrative district of Gmina Miękinia, within Środa Śląska County, Lower Silesian Voivodeship, in south-western Poland. Prior to 1945 it was in Germany.

References

External links
 Strona miejscowosci:
 http://www.wilkostow.pl

 Strona stajni koni:
 http://www.stajnia.wilkostow.pl

Villages in Środa Śląska County